The Owensboro Metropolitan Statistical Area, as defined by the United States Census Bureau, is an area consisting of three counties in Kentucky, anchored by the city of Owensboro. As of the 2000 census, the MSA had a population of 109,875. In the 2010 Census the population was 114,752. Owensboro is part of the Illinois–Indiana–Kentucky tri-state area and sometimes, albeit seldom, referred to as Kentuckiana.

Counties
 Daviess
 Hancock
 McLean

Communities

Incorporated places
 Calhoun 
 Hawesville
 Island
 Lewisport
 Livermore
 Owensboro (Principal city)
 Sacramento 
 Whitesville

Census-designated places
Note: census-designated places are unincorporated.
 Masonville

Demographics
As of the census of 2000, there were 109,875 people, 43,232 households, and 30,142 families residing within the MSA. The racial makeup of the MSA was 94.46% White, 3.72% African American, 0.15% Native American, 0.37% Asian, 0.02% Pacific Islander, 0.41% from other races, and 0.87% from two or more races. Hispanic or Latino of any race were 0.90% of the population.

The median income for a household in the MSA was $34,467, and the median income for a family was $41,240. Males had a median income of $33,012 versus $21,659 for females. The per capita income for the MSA was $17,136.

See also

 Evansville metropolitan area
 Kentucky statistical areas

References

 
Metropolitan areas of Kentucky